Massilia timonae is a Gram-negative, aerobic, rod-shapedbacterium from the genus Massilia and family Oxalobacteraceae, which was isolated from human patients.

References

External links
Type strain of Massilia timonae at BacDive -  the Bacterial Diversity Metadatabase

Burkholderiales
Bacteria described in 2010